Periballia is a genus of Mediterranean plants in the grass family.

 Species
 Periballia involucrata (Cav.) Janka - Spain, Portugal
 Periballia laevis (Brot.) Asch. & Graebn.  - Spain, Portugal, Morocco, Crimea; naturalized in parts of United States
 Periballia minuta (L.) Asch. & Graebn. - Spain, Portugal, France incl Corsica, Italy incl Sicily + Sardinia, Greece, Bulgaria, Albania, Croatia, European Turkey, Algeria, Morocco; naturalized in South Africa + Australia

References

Pooideae
Poaceae genera